Shane S. Lee (born July 4, 1993) is an American professional stock car racing driver. He last competed part-time in the NASCAR Xfinity Series, driving the No. 35 and Toyota Supra/Ford Mustangs for Emerling-Gase Motorsports. He has also competed in the NASCAR Camping World Truck Series and the ARCA Racing Series.

Racing career

Early years
Racing at Hickory Speedway in his youth, Lee was simultaneously Most Popular Driver and Rookie of the Year in the track's Limited Late Model class in 2012. He was Rookie of the Year in the NASCAR Whelen All-American Series in 2013.

ARCA Racing Series
Lee, at the beginning of the 2016 ARCA Racing Series, tested with Win-Tron Racing at Daytona International Speedway in preparation of making his first start in the Lucas Oil 200. The original schedule called for Lee to run nine races. He ran ten, winning the pole at Chicagoland Speedway but otherwise struggling to finish in the top ten early in the season. He picked up his performance later in the season, which translated to a full-time ARCA ride with Cunningham Motorsports for 2017. With a constant teammate in Dalton Sargeant, Lee led laps in four races and scored a top five in his first road course race on his way to a third-place points finish behind champion Austin Theriault and teammate Sargeant.

NASCAR

On March 23, 2016, it was announced that Lee would make his NASCAR Camping World Truck Series debut for SS-Green Light Racing at Martinsville Speedway in April of that year. He finished seventeenth in his debut and ran another race for SS-Green Light at Gateway Motorsports Park before signing with GMS Racing to drive their No. 24 truck at Texas Motor Speedway late in the season. He finished sixteenth and on the lead lap in that race, marking his third consecutive lead-lap finish.

After focusing on the ARCA Racing Series in 2017, it was announced on January 24, 2018 that Lee would drive part-time in the NASCAR Xfinity Series for Richard Childress Racing, splitting the organization's No. 3 car with Austin and Ty Dillon, Jeb Burton, and Brendan Gaughan. Issues plagued his early runs, with a blown tire ruining a potential Top 5 in his debut at Bristol Motor Speedway and a shortage of gas hindering his effort at Talladega Superspeedway.  At Pocono, Lee had a solid run finishing 12th, and then finishing 16th at Iowa.  At Daytona in July, Lee had a great run.  He was in the Top 10 for the majority of the race, finishing a career-best sixth-place finish.  Then at the second Iowa race, he finished 13th.

In May 2019, Lee joined the newly-formed H2 Motorsports to run the remaining Xfinity schedule (with the exception of the road courses) in the No. 28 Circuit City-sponsored  Toyota starting with the CircuitCity.com 250 at Iowa in June. Although he had signed a deal with H2 for the entirety of the 2020 NASCAR Xfinity Series season, he was released by the team for "performance-based" reasons before the Sport Clips VFW 200 at Darlington in August.

In 2022, he returned to the Xfinity series driving for Emerling-Gase Motorsports. At Daytona, he finished 33rd. Atlanta, he finished 17th. Martinsville, he finished 27th. He scored a 14th place finish at Talladega.

Personal life
Lee attended Gaston Community College.

Motorsports career results

NASCAR
(key) (Bold – Pole position awarded by qualifying time. Italics – Pole position earned by points standings or practice time. * – Most laps led.)

Xfinity Series

Camping World Truck Series

 Season still in progress
 Ineligible for series points

ARCA Racing Series

References

External links

NASCAR drivers
1993 births
ARCA Menards Series drivers
Racing drivers from North Carolina
People from Newton, North Carolina
Living people
Richard Childress Racing drivers